Řenče is a municipality and village in Plzeň-South District in the Plzeň Region of the Czech Republic. It has about 900 inhabitants.

Administrative parts
Villages of Háje, Knihy, Libákovice, Osek, Plevňov and Vodokrty are administrative parts of Řenče.

References

Villages in Plzeň-South District